Victoria Scone (born 6 April 1993) is the stage name of Emily Diapre, a British drag queen and cabaret performer based in Cardiff, Wales. She is best known for competing on the third series of RuPaul's Drag Race UK in 2021, where she was the first cisgender female contestant on any series of the Drag Race franchise. She returned to compete in Canada's Drag Race: Canada vs. the World in 2022.

Career
Diapre is a professionally-trained actor, singer and dancer. Prior to becoming a full-time drag performer, Diapre worked as a sales and events coordinator. She chose the stage name Victoria Scone because she wanted "something very British." "I wanted something edible, being a curvaceous woman as I am. It's also a pun as in 'Where's Victoria? Victoria's gone!'"

Diapre competed in the third series RuPaul's Drag Race UK, she was the first cisgender female competitor on any season of the Drag Race franchise. She had been doing drag for approximately three years when she competed on the show. She placed in the top 2 in the first episode, however she withdrew from the show on the third episode after partially tearing her anterior cruciate ligament during her top 2 lip sync for the win with Krystal Versace.

Personal life
Diapre is based in Cardiff. On Drag Race UK, she discussed a previous struggle with bulimia nervosa. She is a cisgender woman and a lesbian who uses she/her pronouns in and out of drag.

Filmography

Web series

Discography

Featured singles

Awards and nominations

References

External links
 

1993 births
Living people
20th-century LGBT people
21st-century LGBT people
English drag queens
Lesbian entertainers
People from Cardiff
RuPaul's Drag Race UK contestants